Medusa is a 1973 American mystery drama film starring and produced by George Hamilton directed by Gordon Hessler. It was co written by Christopher Wicking, the last of five collaborations he had with Hessler. It was Hamilton's second film as producer (the first being Evel Knievel) and was shot in Greece.

Plot
A stewardess is murdered by a masked man in Greece. The leading suspects are an American playboy and a gangster.

Cast
George Hamilton as Jeffrey
Luciana Paluzzi as Sarah
Cameron Mitchell as Angelo
Alana Stewart as Eleana

References

External links

Medusa at Letterbox DVD

1973 films
1970s mystery drama films
American mystery drama films
Films directed by Gordon Hessler
1973 drama films
1970s English-language films
1970s American films